Postling village and civil parish is situated near the Roman road of Stone Street, about  south of Canterbury, Kent, in South East England. Postlinges is the spelling used in the Domesday Book where it was part of the lands of Hugo de Montfort; Postlinge is also seen in old records. There is much archaeological evidence of continued occupation of the area. Postling Court is, in effect, the old manor-house, although is, more correctly as the name suggests, the one-time meeting place of the local court and magistrate. The population of the civil parish includes the hamlet of Newbarn.

The parish church is dedicated to Saints Mary and Radegund. It is a Grade I listed building.  The oldest parts are from the late 11th or 12th century.

A junction south of the village is known as Postling Wents; "went" or "vent" is an older Kent word which means "ways". It was once the crossroads where the London to Folkestone road crossed the Lympne to Lyminge road, but is now a sharp bend on the A20.

See also
 Tolsford Hill BT Tower is visible to the east of the village

References

Further reading
 Hasted

External links

Civil parishes in Kent
Villages in Kent